Ida B. Wells-Barnett High School, formerly known as Woodrow Wilson High School (and colloquially as Wells High School), is a public high school in Portland, Oregon, United States.

History
Wells High School (originally Woodrow Wilson High School) was built in 1956, after a ballot measure was passed in 1945 providing $5 million to improve Portland's school system. Population was growing explosively, so emphasis was put on economy and ease of building, instead of on architectural style as was the norm in the earlier school buildings. Wells High School, which was designed by the firm Edmundson and Kochendoerfer, used the technique of lift-slab construction to speed up construction. Wells was the first building in the Northwest to use that technique.

In July 2020, Portland Public Schools pledged to rename the school in response to pressure from the community in light of the racial justice movement that followed the murder of George Floyd. In January 2021, the name was changed to Ida B. Wells-Barnett High School, in honor of Ida B. Wells. The mascot was also changed from the Trojans to the Guardians (represented by an owl).

Notable alumni
 Kenji Bunch, violist and composer
 Ginny Burdick, communications consultant and member of the Oregon State Senate
 David Gilkey, Nationally recognized photojournalist and war correspondent.
 Boaz Frankel, television personality
 Peter Gassner, founder and CEO of Veeva Systems. The company's primary focus is cloud-based software development and providing for randomization and trial supply management (RTSM).
 Alicia Lagano, actress
 Paul Linnman, television news reporter and anchor; radio personality
 Dale Murphy, professional baseball player, 7-time All-Star, twice National League MVP
 Damon Stoudamire, basketball player and coach, 1996 NBA Rookie of the Year
 Wayne Twitchell, professional baseball player

References

External links

 

1956 establishments in Oregon
Educational institutions established in 1956
High schools in Portland, Oregon
Hillsdale, Portland, Oregon
Portland Public Schools (Oregon)
Public high schools in Oregon
Name changes due to the George Floyd protests